Lucas Ramírez Galán, OFM (18 October 1715 – 19 March 1774) was a Spanish Roman Catholic archbishop. He served as Bishop of Tui from 1770 to 1774. Previously, he served as Archbishop of Bogotá from 1769 to 1770 and Auxiliary Bishop of Cartagena from 1761 to 1769.

Biography 
Ramírez was born in Belalcázar, Spain, on 18 October 1715.

On 6 April 1761, he was appointed Auxiliary Bishop of Cartagena and Titular Bishop of Tanis. His episcopal consecration was held on 31 May 1761, with Cardinal Francisco de Solís Folch de Cardona serving as principal consecrator, and bishops Francisco Alejandro Bocanegra Jivaja and Domingo Pérez Rivera serving as co-consecrators. On 12 June 1769, he was appointed Bishop of Chiapas in New Spain (today part of Mexico). However, he never ultimately arrived in Chiapas to take leadership of the diocese.

On 15 July 1769 he was selected, and on 21 August confirmed, as the Archbishop of Santafé en Nueva Granada (today Bogotá). He served as archbishop until 12 December 1770, when he was appointed Bishop of Tui, Spain. He died on 19 March 1774. During his life, he served as the co-consecrator of three bishops: Cardinal Francisco Javier Delgado y Venegas in 1761, Bishop Juan Bautista Cervera, OFMDisc., in 1769, and Archbishop Joaquín de Eleta, OFM, in 1770).

Episcopal lineage 
Galán's episcopal lineage is listed as follows, with each bishop's year of consecration parenthesized:
 Cardinal Scipione Rebiba
 Cardinal Giulio Antonio Santorio (1566)
 Cardinal Girolamo Bernerio, OP (1586)
 Archbishop Galeazzo Sanvitale (1604)
 Cardinal Ludovico Ludovisi (1621)
 Cardinal Luigi Caetani (1622)
 Cardinal Ulderico Carpegna (1630)
 Cardinal Paluzzo Paluzzi Altieri degli Albertoni (1666)
 Pope Benedict XIII (1675)
 Pope Benedict XIV (1724)
 Archbishop Enrico Enríquez (1743)
 Cardinal Francisco de Solís Folch de Cardona (1749)
 Archbishop Lucas Ramírez Galán (1761)

References

External links and additional sources
 (for Chronology of Bishops) 
 (for Chronology of Bishops) 

1774 deaths
18th-century Roman Catholic archbishops in New Granada
Roman Catholic archbishops of Bogotá
Bishops appointed by Pope Clement XIII
Bishops appointed by Pope Clement XIV
People from the Province of Córdoba (Spain)
18th-century Roman Catholic bishops in Spain
Spanish Roman Catholic bishops in South America
Viceroyalty of New Granada people
1715 births